Story of a Cloistered Nun (released as Unholy Convent and Diary of a Cloistered Nun) is a 1973 nunsploitation film directed by Domenico Paolella and starring Eleonora Giorgi, Catherine Spaak, Suzy Kendall, Martine Brochard, Tino Carraro, and Umberto Orsini. The film claims to be inspired by real events that occurred in the 16th-century at the Certosa di San Giacomo.

Plot 
Refusing an arranged marriage, young aristocrat Carmela Simoni is sent to a convent. Her arrival intensifies the power struggle between the debauched nun Elisabeth, and the stern but evil Mother Superior, as both are smitten by Carmela's beauty.

Cast 
Joan Collins was originally cast as the Mother Superior, but was replaced by Suzy Kendall before filming started.

References

External links

1973 films
1973 drama films
1973 LGBT-related films
Films set in the 1620s
1970s Italian-language films
Nunsploitation films
German films based on actual events
Italian films based on actual events
Films directed by Domenico Paolella
Lesbian-related films
Films scored by Piero Piccioni
Italian LGBT-related films
West German films
German historical drama films
Italian historical drama films
1970s Italian films
1970s German films